Michalis Perrakis (Greek: Μιχάλης Περράκης; born on March 15, 1984, in Athens, Greece) is a Greek professional basketball player who last played for Lavrio of the Greek Basket League. He is a 6'9" (2.07 m) tall  center, who can also play as a power forward.

Professional career
Perrakis played amateur basket for Lavrio before starting his pro career in 2002 with AEK Athens. The same year, he was loaned to the Greek League club Ionikos N.F.

In 2004, he signed with Olympia Patras. In 2006, he moved to Sporting.

In 2009, Perrakis returned to Lavrio after 6 years. He became the captain of the club, after the long-time captain Sakis Giannakopoulos retired in 2018.

References

External links
Eurobasket.com Profile 
Greek League Profile
DraftExpress.com Profile
Basketball-Reference.com Profile
FIBA.com Profile

1985 births
Living people
AEK B.C. players
Apollon Kalamarias B.C. players
Greek Basket League players
Greek men's basketball players
Ionikos N.F. B.C. players
Lavrio B.C. players
Olympias Patras B.C. players
Sporting basketball players
Centers (basketball)
Power forwards (basketball)
Basketball players from Athens